The 1963 Arab Cup was the first edition of the Arab Cup hosted in Beirut, Lebanon. Tunisia won the first title of the Arab Cup.

Participating teams 
The 5 participated teams are:

Venues

Squads

Final tournament

Tournament classification

Matches

Goalscorers 
5 goals
  Levon Altounian

4 goals
  Mongi Haddad

References

External links 
 1963 Arab Cup – rsssf.com
 لبنان أوّل مستضيف لكأس العرب 1963 – Nida Al-Watan

 
Arab Cup, 1963
International association football competitions hosted by Lebanon
Arab
1962–63 in Lebanese football
March 1963 sports events in Asia
April 1963 sports events in Asia